The Lebanon Southern Pacific Railroad Depot is a former railway station located in Lebanon, Oregon, Oregon, listed on the National Register of Historic Places. It was constructed in 1908 for use by the Southern Pacific Company (SP), to replace an 1880 depot that had become too small for the amount of traffic it was handling. It is a Southern Pacific standard design, a One Story Combination Depot No. 23, which was intended to serve both freight and passenger traffic. The building ceased to be used by passenger services in the mid-1950s, after which it remained in use as a base for freight operations. The depot closed in 1985 and was then vacant for several years, until the City of Lebanon purchased it from SP in 1996. It was added to the NRHP in 1997.

See also
 National Register of Historic Places listings in Linn County, Oregon

References

1908 establishments in Oregon
Former Southern Pacific Railroad stations in Oregon
Southern Pacific Railroad Depot
National Register of Historic Places in Linn County, Oregon
Railway stations in the United States opened in 1908
Railway stations on the National Register of Historic Places in Oregon
Transportation buildings and structures in Linn County, Oregon